Daqin (alternative transliterations include Tachin, Tai-Ch'in) is the ancient Chinese name for the Roman Empire or, depending on context, the Near East, especially Syria. It literally means "great Qin"; Qin being the name of the founding dynasty of the Chinese Empire. Historian John Foster defined it as "the Roman Empire, or rather that part of it which alone was known to the Chinese, Syria". Its basic facets such as laws, customs, dress, and currency were explained in Chinese sources. Its medieval incarnation was described in histories during the Tang dynasty (618–907 AD) onwards as Fulin, which Friedrich Hirth and other scholars have identified as the Byzantine Empire. Daqin was also commonly associated with the Syriac-speaking Nestorian Christians who lived in China during the Tang dynasty.

Chinese sources describe several ancient Roman embassies arriving in China, beginning in 166 AD and lasting into the 3rd century. These early embassies were said to arrive by a maritime route via the South China Sea in the Chinese province of Jiaozhi (now northern Vietnam). Archaeological evidence such as Roman coins points to the presence of Roman commercial activity in Southeast Asia. Later recorded embassies arriving from the Byzantine Empire, lasting from the 7th to 11th centuries, ostensibly took an overland route following the Silk Road, alongside other Europeans in Medieval China. Byzantine Greeks are recorded as being present in the court of Kublai Khan (1260–1294), the Mongol ruler of the Yuan dynasty in Khanbaliq (Beijing), while the Hongwu Emperor (r. 1368–1398), founder of the Ming dynasty, sent a letter of correspondence to Byzantine emperor John V Palaiologos.

Etymology

Daqin
The term Daqin (Middle Chinese: /dɑiH d͡ziɪn/), meaning "Great Qin," is derived from the dynasty founded by Qin Shi Huang, ruler of the State of Qin and China's first emperor who unified China's Warring States by 221 BC. The prefix da (大) or "great" signified that the Roman Empire was on par with the might of the Qin dynasty and was viewed as a utopian land located to the northwest of the Parthian Empire. The title Daqin does not seem to have any phonetic derivation from Latin Roma or Greek Romaikē. On the other hand, it is possible that the Latin term used for China, Serica (derived from Greek Serikon, commonly understood as "Land of Silk", from Chinese si , meaning silk), originated from the name Qin using Early Middle Chinese pronunciation (with the final consonant pronounced with an -r sound).

Fulin
The term Daqin was used from the Han dynasty (202 BC – 220 AD) onwards, but by the beginning of the Tang dynasty (618–907 AD) a new name emerged in Chinese historical records for distinguishing the Eastern Roman Empire: Fulin. Friedrich Hirth surmised that Fulin may have been based on the accusative form of Konstantinoupolis, the Greek name of Constantinople, or rather its paraphrase hē Pólis ("the City"), giving (in the accusative) (tḕn) Pólin. Using historical phonetic pronunciations of Cantonese and Japanese, Hirth also speculated that Fulin in Middle Chinese was pronounced Butlim or Butlam and thus might have also come from the Syriac pronunciation for Bethlehem. While some scholars of the 20th century believed that Fulin was a transliteration of Ephrem, an ancient word for Israel, Samuel N. C. Lieu highlights how more recent scholarship has deduced that Fulin is most likely derived from the Persianate word for the Roman Empire shared by several contemporaneous Iranian languages.

History

Early descriptions by Gan Ying
Following the opening of the Silk Road in the 2nd century BC, the Chinese thought of the Roman Empire as a civilized counterpart to the Chinese Empire. The Romans occupied one extreme position on the trade route, with the Chinese located on the other.

China never managed to reach the Roman Empire directly in antiquity, although general Ban Chao sent Gan Ying as an envoy to "Daqin" in 97 AD. Gan Ying did not reach Daqin: he stopped at the coast of a large sea, because "sailor(s) of the Parthian west border" told him that the voyage to cross the sea might take a long time and be dangerous. Gan Ying left a detailed account of the Roman Empire, but it is generally considered to have been based on second-hand information from Parthians:

Gan Ying gives a very idealistic view of Roman governance which is likely the result of some story he was told while visiting the Persian Gulf in 97 AD. He also described, less fancifully, Roman products:

Geographical descriptions in the Weilüe

In the Weilüe written by Yu Huan (c. 239–265), a text that is preserved in the Records of the Three Kingdoms by Pei Songzhi (published in 429), a more detailed description of the Eastern portion of the Roman Empire is given, particularly the province of Roman Egypt. The 19th-century sinologist Friedrich Hirth translated the passages and identified the places named in them, which have been edited by Jerome S. Arkenberg in 2000 (with Wade-Giles spelling):

The Weilüe also noted that the Daqin had small "dependent" vassal states, too many to list as the text claims, yet it mentions some as being the Alexandria-Euphrates or Charax Spasinu ("Ala-san"), Nikephorium ("Lu-fen"), Palmyra ("Ch'ieh-lan"), Damascus ("Hsien-tu"), Emesa ("Si-fu"), and Hira ("Ho-lat"). Perhaps some of these are in reference to certain states that were temporarily conquered during the Roman–Parthian Wars (66 BC – 217 AD) when, for instance, the army of Roman Emperor Trajan reached the Persian Gulf and captured Characene, the capital of which was Charax Spasinu. The Weilüe provides the traveling directions and approximate distances between each of these cities, counted in ancient Chinese miles (li), and along with the Book of Later Han even mentions the pontoon bridge ("flying bridge") across the Euphrates at the Roman city of Zeugma, Commagene (in modern-day Turkey).

Hirth and Arkenberg identified Si-fu (Chinese: 汜復) with Emesa. However, John E. Hill provides evidence that it was most likely Petra (in the Nabataean Kingdom), given the directions and distance from "Yuluo" (i.e. Al Karak) and the fact that it fell under Roman dominion in 106 AD when it was annexed by Trajan. Even more convincing for Hill is the fact that Si-fu in Chinese means "an arm of a river which rejoins the main stream" or more aptly "rejoined water courses". He believes this is directly related to the reservoir and cistern flood-control system harnessing the many streams running through the settlement and nearby canyons, or wadis, such as the Wadi Musa ("Valley of Moses").

Christianity

In later eras, starting in AD 550, as Syriac Christians settled along the Silk Road and founded mission churches, Daqin or Tai-Ch'in is also used to refer to these Christian populations rather than to Rome or the Roman church.  So, for example, when the Taoist Emperor Wuzong of Tang closed Christian monasteries in the mid-9th century, the imperial edict commanded:

The name "Daqin" for Rome was used on Chinese maps as late as the 16th century, such as the Sihai Huayi Zongtu. The identification of "Daqin" with the Western Roman Empire, Eastern Roman Empire, or the Church of the East varies with the era and context of the document. The Nestorian Stele erected in 781 in the Tang capital Chang'an contains an inscription that briefly summarizes the knowledge about Daqin in the Chinese histories written up to that point and notes how only the "luminous" religion (i.e. Christianity) was practiced there.

Capital cities
To the Chinese, the capital of Daqin was "An-tu", or Antioch, the first great Christian city. However, the Old Book of Tang and New Book of Tang, which identified Daqin and "Fulin" (拂菻; i.e. the Byzantine Empire) as the same countries, noted a different capital city (Constantinople), one that had walls of "enormous height" and was eventually besieged by the commander "Mo-yi" (Chinese: 摩拽伐之; Pinyin: Mó zhuāi fá zhī) of the Da shi (大食; i.e. the Arabs). Friedrich Hirth identifies this commander as Muawiyah I, who was first governor of Syria before becoming caliph and founder of the Umayyad Caliphate. The city of Rome itself does not appear to have been described.

Embassies

Starting in the 1st century BC with Virgil, Horace, and Strabo, Roman histories offer only vague accounts of China and the silk-producing Seres of the distant east. The 2nd-century historian Florus seems to have conflated the Seres with peoples of India, or at least noted that their skin complexions proved that they both lived "beneath another sky" than the Romans. The 1st-century geographer Pomponius Mela noted that their lands formed the center of the coast of an eastern ocean, flanked by India to the south and the Scythians of the northern steppe, while the historian Ammianus Marcellinus (c. 330 – c. 400) wrote that the land of the Seres was enclosed by great natural walls around a river called Bautis, perhaps the Yellow River. In his Geography, Ptolemy also provided a rough sketch of the Gulf of Thailand and South China Sea, with a port city called Cattigara lying beyond the Golden Chersonese (i.e. Malay Peninsula) visited by a Greek sailor named Alexander. Among the proposed sites for Ptolemy's Cattigara are Oc Eo, Vietnam, where Roman artefacts have been found.

In contrast, Chinese histories offer an abundance of source material about their interactions with alleged Roman embassies and descriptions of their country. The first of these embassies is recorded in the Book of Later Han as having arrived by sea in 166 AD and came by way of Jiaozhou, later known as Annam (northern Vietnam), as would later embassies. Its members claimed to be representatives of the Daqin ruler "Andun" (安敦), either Antoninus Pius or his co-emperor Marcus Aurelius Antoninus, and offered gifts to the court of Emperor Huan of Han. Other embassies arrived sporadically afterwards. The Book of Liang mentions a Daqin embassy to Sun Quan of Eastern Wu in 226, while the Book of Jin records a Daqin embassy to Emperor Wu of Jin in 284.

Although Emperor Yang of Sui (r. 604–618) had desired to send an embassy to Daqin, this never came to fruition. Instead, an embassy from a country that was now called Fulin (拂菻, i.e. the Byzantine Empire), which the Old Book of Tang and New Book of Tang identified as being the same as Daqin, arrived in 643 at the court of Emperor Taizong of Tang and claimed to represent their king Bo duoli (波多力; i.e. Kōnstantinos Pogonatos, "Constantine the Bearded", the nickname of Constans II). Several other Fulin (i.e. Byzantium) embassies during the Tang dynasty are mentioned for the years 667, 701, and 719.

The Wenxian Tongkao written by Ma Duanlin (1245–1322) and the History of Song record that the Byzantine emperor Michael VII Parapinakēs Caesar (Mie li sha ling kai sa 滅力沙靈改撒) of Fulin (i.e. Byzantium) sent an embassy to China that arrived in 1081, during the reign of Emperor Shenzong of Song (r. 1067–1085). During the subsequent Yuan dynasty (1271–1368), an unprecedented number of Europeans started to visit and live in China, such as Marco Polo and Katarina Vilioni, and papal missionaries such as John of Montecorvino and Giovanni de Marignolli. The History of Yuan recounts how a man of Fulin named Ai-sie (transliteration of either Joshua or Joseph), initially in the service of Güyük Khan, was well-versed in Western languages and had expertise in the fields of medicine and astronomy. This convinced Kublai Khan, founder of the Yuan dynasty, to offer him a position as the director of medical and astronomical boards, eventually honoring him with the title of Prince of Fulin (Chinese: 拂菻王; Fú lǐn wáng). His biography in the History of Yuan lists his children by their Chinese names, which are similar to the Christian names Elias (Ye-li-ah), Luke (Lu-ko), and Antony (An-tun), with a daughter named A-na-si-sz.

The History of Ming explains how the founder of the Ming dynasty (1368–1644), the Hongwu Emperor, sent a merchant of Fulin named "Nieh-ku-lun" (捏古倫) back to his home country with a letter announcing the founding of a new dynasty. It is speculated that this "merchant" was actually a former bishop of Khanbaliq named Nicolaus de Bentra. The History of Ming goes on to explain that contacts between China and Fulin ceased thereafter, whereas an envoy of the great western sea (i.e. the Mediterranean Sea) did not arrive again until the 16th century, with the Italian Jesuit missionary Matteo Ricci.

Currency and coinage

Although the ancient Romans imported Han Chinese silk while the Han-dynasty Chinese imported Roman glasswares as discovered in their tombs, Valerie Hansen (2012) claimed that no Roman coins from the Roman Republic (507–27 BC) or the Principate (27 BC–284 AD) era of the Roman Empire have been found in China. Yet this assumption has been overturned; Warwick Ball (2016) notes the discovery of sixteen Roman coins found at Xi'an, China (site of the Han capital Chang'an) minted during the reign of various emperors from Tiberius (14–37 AD) to Aurelian (270–275 AD). The earliest gold solidus coins from the Eastern Roman Empire found in China date to the reign of Byzantine emperor Theodosius II (r. 408–450) and altogether only forty-eight of them have been found (compared to thirteen hundred silver coins) in Xinjiang and the rest of China. However, Roman golden medallions from the reign of Antoninus Pius, and possibly his successor Marcus Aurelius, have been discovered at Óc Eo in southern Vietnam, which was then part of the Kingdom of Funan bordering the Chinese province of Jiaozhi in northern Vietnam. This was the same region where Chinese historical texts claim the Romans first landed before venturing further into China to conduct diplomacy.

Chinese histories offer descriptions of Byzantine coins. In discussing trade with India, the Parthian Empire and the Roman Empire, the Book of Jin, as well as the later Wenxian Tongkao, noted how ten ancient Roman silver coins were worth one Roman gold coin. With fluctuations, the Roman golden aureus was worth about twenty-five silver denarii. The History of Song notes how the Byzantines made coins of either silver or gold, without holes in the middle yet with an inscription of the king's name.

Law and order

The History of Song described forms of punishment in criminal law as they were carried out in Daqin (Roman Empire) and Fulin (Byzantine Empire). It states that they made a distinction between minor and major offenses, with 200 strikes from a bamboo rod being reserved for major crimes. It described their form of capital punishment as having the guilty person being stuffed into a "feather bag" and thrown into the sea. This seems to correspond with the Romano-Byzantine punishment of poena cullei (from Latin "punishment of the sack"), where those who committed parricide (i.e. murder of a father or mother) were sewn up into a sack, sometimes with wild animals, and thrown into either a river or sea. The History of Song also mentioned how it was forbidden by law to counterfeit the coins minted by Fulin. These descriptions from the History of Song are also found in the Wenxian Tongkao.

Naming conventions

In the Chinese histories, the names of Romans and Byzantines were often transliterated into Chinese as they were heard, yet occasionally the surname stemmed from their country of origin, Daqin (大秦). For instance, the Roman merchant Qin Lun (秦論), who visited the Eastern Wu court of Sun Quan in 226 AD, bears the surname derived from the name for his homeland, while having a given name that is perhaps derived from the Greek name Leon (e.g. Leon of Sparta). In the Han-era stage of the spoken language intermediate between Old Chinese and Middle Chinese, the pronunciation for his given name "Lun" (論) would have sounded quite different from modern spoken Mandarin: K. 470b *li̯wən / li̯uĕn or *lwən / luən; EMC lwən or lwənh.

Granting Roman individuals the surname "Qin" followed a common Chinese naming convention for foreign peoples. For instance, people from the Parthian Empire of ancient Persia such as An Shigao were often given the surname "An" (安) derived from Anxi (安息), the Arsacid dynasty. The Sogdians, an Eastern Iranian people from Central Asia, were also frequently given the surname "An" (e.g. An Chongzhang), especially those from Bukhara, while Sogdians from Samarkand were surnamed "Kang" (康; e.g. Kang Senghui), derived from Kangju, the Chinese term for Transoxiana. The name given for Antoninus Pius/Marcus Aurelius Antoninus in the Chinese histories was "An Dun" (安敦).

See also 

 Christianity in China
 Daqin Pagoda
 Europeans in Medieval China
 Foreign relations of imperial China
 Michael Shen Fu-Tsung, Chinese visitor to Europe in the 17th century
 Nestorian Stele (Memorial of the Propagation in China of the Luminous Religion from Daqin)
 History of the Han dynasty
 Seres and Serica, Latin Roman words for Chinese and China, respectively; see also Sinae
 Sino-Roman relations
 Zhang Qian, Western-Han Chinese explorer of Central Asia during the 2nd century BC

Notes

References

Citations

Sources 

 Bauman, Richard A. (2005). Crime and Punishment in Ancient Rome. London & New York: Routledge, reprint of 1996 edition, .
 Ball, Warwick (2016). Rome in the East: Transformation of an Empire, 2nd edition, London & New York: Routledge. .
 Bretschneider, Emil (2000) [1888]. Medieval Researches from Eastern Asiatic Sources: Fragments Towards the Knowledge of the Geography and History of Central and Western Asia from the 13th to the 17th Century, Vol. 1, reprint edition. Abingdon: Routledge.
 Brosius, Maria (2006). The Persians: An Introduction. London & New York: Routledge. .
 Foster, John (1939). The Church in T'ang Dynasty. Great Britain: Society for Promoting Christian Knowledge.
 Galambos, Imre (2015). "She Association Circulars from Dunhuang", in Antje Richter, A History of Chinese Letters and Epistolary Culture. Leiden & Boston: Brill.
 Garthwaite, Gene Ralph (2005). The Persians. Oxford & Carlton: Blackwell Publishing, Ltd., .
 Grant, R. G. (2005). Battle: A Visual Journey Through 5,000 Years of Combat. DK Publishers. .
 Hansen, Valerie (2012). The Silk Road: A New History, Oxford: Oxford University Press. .
 Haw, Stephen G. (2006). Marco Polo's China: a Venetian in the Realm of Kublai Khan. London & New York: Routledge. .
 Hill, John E. (2004). The Peoples of the West from the Weilue 魏略 by Yu Huan 魚豢: A Third Century Chinese Account Composed between 239 and 265. Draft annotated English translation.  
 
 
  
 Jenkins, Philip (2008). The Lost History of Christianity: the Thousand-Year Golden Age of the Church in the Middle East, Africa, and Asia – and How It Died. New York: Harper Collins. .
 Lieu, Samuel N.C. (2013). "The 'Romanitas' of the Xi'an Inscription," in Li Tang and Deitmer W. Winkler (eds), From the Oxus to the Chinese Shores: Studies on East Syriac Christianity in China and Central Asia. Zürich & Berlin: Lit Verlag. .
 Luttwak, Edward. (1 November 2009). The Grand Strategy of the Byzantine Empire. Harvard University Press. .
 Mawer, Granville Allen (2013). "The Riddle of Catigara" in Robert Nichols and Martin Woods (eds), Mapping Our World: Terra Incognita to Australia, 38–39. Canberra: National Library of Australia. .
 Osborne, Milton (2006) [2000]. The Mekong: Turbulent Past, Uncertain Future. Crows Nest: Allen & Unwin, revised edition. .
 Ostrovsky, Max (2007). Y = Arctg X: the Hyperbola of the World Order. Lanham, Boulder, New York, Toronto, Plymouth: University Press of America. .
 Sezgin, Fuat; Carl Ehrig-Eggert; Amawi Mazen; E. Neubauer (1996). نصوص ودراسات من مصادر صينية حول البلدان الاسلامية. Frankfurt am Main: Institut für Geschichte der Arabisch-Islamischen Wissenschaften (Institute for the History of Arabic-Islamic Science at the Johann Wolfgang Goethe University).
 Wood, Frances(2002). The Silk Road: Two Thousand Years in the Heart of Asia. University of California Press. .
 Young, Gary K. (2001). Rome's Eastern Trade: International Commerce and Imperial Policy, 31 BC - AD 305. London & New York: Routledge. .
 Yü, Ying-shih. (1986). "Han Foreign Relations," in Denis Twitchett and Michael Loewe (eds), The Cambridge History of China: Volume I: the Ch'in and Han Empires, 221 B.C. – A.D. 220, 377–462. Cambridge: Cambridge University Press. .
 Yule, Henry (1886). Cathay and the Way Thither. Downloaded 22/12/04 from: http://dsr.nii.ac.jp/toyobunko/III-2-F-b-2/V-1/ and http://dsr.nii.ac.jp/toyobunko/III-2-F-b-2/V-2/.

Further reading 
Leslie, D. D., Gardiner, K. H. J.: "The Roman Empire in Chinese Sources", Studi Orientali, Vol. 15. Rome: Department of Oriental Studies, University of Rome, 1996
Pulleyblank, Edwin G.: "The Roman Empire as Known to Han China", Journal of the American Oriental Society, Vol. 119, No. 1 (1999), pp. 71–79

External links 
 Accounts of Daqin in the Chinese history of the Later Han Hou Hanshu
 Chang'an the ancient capital of China

Foreign relations of ancient Rome
Historical Chinese exonyms
History of Christianity in China
History of the foreign relations of China